Micah Kiser (born January 25, 1995) is an American football outside linebacker who is a free agent. He played college football at Virginia, and was drafted by the Los Angeles Rams in the 2018 NFL Draft. He has also played for the Denver Broncos.

Early years
Kiser attended the Gilman School in Baltimore, Maryland.  He committed to the University of Virginia to play college football.

College career
Kiser played college football for Virginia from 2013 to 2017. As a senior, he won the William V. Campbell Trophy and was named an All-American by the Sporting News. During his career, he had 408 tackles, 19 sacks, and one interception.

Professional career

Los Angeles Rams
Kiser was drafted by the Los Angeles Rams in the fifth round (147th overall) of the 2018 NFL Draft.

Kiser was placed on injured reserve on August 31, 2019.

In Week 2 of the 2020 season against the Philadelphia Eagles, Kiser recorded a team high 16 tackles (11 solo) and forced a fumble on running back Miles Sanders which was recovered by teammate Kenny Young during the 37–19 win. He was named the NFC Defensive Player of the Week for his performance in Week 2. He was placed on injured reserve on November 26, 2020. On December 30, 2020, Kiser was activated off of injured reserve.

On August 31, 2021, Kiser was waived by the Rams and re-signed to the practice squad the next day.

Denver Broncos
On September 22, 2021, Kiser was signed by the Denver Broncos off the Rams practice squad. He was placed on injured reserve on October 23, 2021. He was activated on December 11.

Las Vegas Raiders
On March 21, 2022, Kiser signed with the Las Vegas Raiders. On August 1, 2022, Kiser was placed on injured reserve.

References

External links
Los Angeles Rams bio
Virginia Cavaliers bio

1995 births
Living people
American football linebackers
Players of American football from Baltimore
Virginia Cavaliers football players
Los Angeles Rams players
Gilman School alumni
Denver Broncos players
Las Vegas Raiders players